Depressaria pentheri is a species of moth in the family Depressariidae. It is found in Bulgaria, Albania and Bosnia and Herzegovina.

The wingspan is about 23 mm.

References

External links
lepiforum.de

Moths described in 1904
Depressaria
Moths of Europe